Seyyed Mansur (also Romanized as Seyyed Manşūr; also known as Seyah Manşūr and Shāh Manşūr) is a village in Garmeh-ye Shomali Rural District, Kandovan District, Meyaneh County, East Azerbaijan Province, Iran. At the 2006 census, its population was 188, in 42 families.

References 

Populated places in Meyaneh County